Rodolfo Castillo (born 7 December 1932) is a Costa Rican weightlifter. He competed in the men's light heavyweight event at the 1968 Summer Olympics.

References

1932 births
Living people
Costa Rican male weightlifters
Olympic weightlifters of Costa Rica
Weightlifters at the 1968 Summer Olympics
Sportspeople from San José, Costa Rica